Port Edgar railway station served the town of South Queensferry, Scotland, from 1878 to 1890 on the Port Edgar Extension line.

History 
The station was opened on 2 September 1878 by the North British Railway. To the west was the signal box and a siding on the reverse side served North British Creosote Works to the east. The station closed on 5 March 1890.

References

External links 

Disused railway stations in Edinburgh
Former North British Railway stations
Railway stations in Great Britain opened in 1878
Railway stations in Great Britain closed in 1890
1878 establishments in Scotland
1890 disestablishments in Scotland